The East Branch Nezinscot River is a  river in Maine. It flows from its source on Black Mountain in Peru to its confluence with the West Branch in Buckfield. The resulting river, the Nezinscot, continues east to the Androscoggin River, which flows to the Kennebec River near its mouth at the Atlantic Ocean.

See also
List of rivers of Maine

References

Maine Streamflow Data from the USGS
Maine Watershed Data From Environmental Protection Agency

Tributaries of the Kennebec River
Rivers of Oxford County, Maine
Rivers of Maine